Compass is a novel by the French writer Mathias Énard, published in 2015.

The book received the Prix Goncourt.

Premise
During a sleepless night in Vienna, the musicologist Franz Ritter looks back on his life, his university career, his stays in the Orient, and his love, Sarah.

Reception
Writing in Le Monde, Raphaëlle Leyris remarked that if Énard's earlier novel Zone was a book of violence and hate, Compass may be the antidote with the taste of the unknown and curiosity for the other at its heart.  described Compass as an ‘intimate and effusive encyclopedia disguised as a novel’. He went on to make reference to Enard's erudition and background as an orientalist.

In a piece on Orientalism published in the New York Review of Books, Adam Shatz argued that with Compass Enard had failed to ‘transcend the oppressive nature of Orientalism, via paradoxically, the Orientalist tradition itself’. The novel has also been described in the press as a ‘masterful novel’ that recognises the contribution of Islamic and Middle Eastern cultures to the canon, ‘lyrically and intellectually rich’, and a ‘powerful work’ that also threatens to send the reader to sleep with its level of detail.

See also
 2015 in literature
 Contemporary French literature

References

2015 French novels
French-language novels
Prix Goncourt winning works
Actes Sud books
Novels set in Vienna